Doordarshan Madhya Pradesh often abbreviated as DD Madhya Pradesh (Hindi: दूरदर्शन मध्यप्रदेश) is a 24-hour regional satellite TV channel primarily telecasting from Doordarshan Kendra Bhopal (DDK Bhopal) and is a part of the state-owned Doordarshan television network. It was previously known as DD-11 Madhya pradesh. 

It primarily serves the Indian state of Madhya Pradesh.

History
The studio of Doordarshan Kendra Bhopal was commissioned on 20 October 1992. It started as a Regional Kendra and has ever since played a major role as a Public Service Broadcaster for viewers of the state. It has enormously enriched the ethos of this land while projecting and promoting the cultural heritage of the State.

Language
Although the main language of transmission is Hindi, yet programmes in other dialects which are spoken in the different parts of Madhya Pradesh viz. Bagheli, Bundeli, Nimari & Malvi are also included in the telecasts.

Technology
 Technical Facilities at DDK
Doordarshan Kendra Bhopal was commissioned on 20 October 1992.
There are two Studios – A of an area of 374 Sq.m. and Continuity Booth (Studio-B) of an area of 50 Sq.m. two Transmitters (DD-I & DD-News) of 10 KW each, one Earth Station Unlinking the Regional Service of M.P., one OB Van for outdoor live coverage's and one DSNG Van for Mobile unlinking.

POST PRODUCTION FACILITY

There is a separate post production section having 3 nos. of edit suites with voice over facility, each edit suite having following component of the equipment.
Edit Suit-1[A/B Roll edit suit with DVE cum Video switcher]
VM (Snell & Wilcox), Edit Controller AJ 850, Audio mixer (12 Channel), CD Player, Phone in console, move CG 2001, DVC pro AJ-D455E, PVW-2800P, PVW-2800P
Edit Suit-2 [Beta Edit Suit with FXE-120P]
FXE-120P, PVW-2800P, DVC Pro AJ-D455E, BVW-70P
Edit Suit-3 [A/B Roll edit suit with DVE cum Video switcher & DVCPRO50 digital VCRs.Beta]
VM (Snell & Wilcox), Edit Controller AJ 850, Audio mixer (12 Channel), DVCPro 50 AJ- SD 965E (Player-I), PVW-2800P, (Player-2), DVCPRO50 AJ-SD965 (recorder).

Computerized editing system is also available at this Centre having the latest state of the art technology used for editing/post production for better presentation of the programmes namely, NLE, Media 100,DPS Velocity, QUATTRUS NLE, 3D Graphics & ISLEWIZ Computer graphics.

DTH availability
The satellite channel of DD Madhya Pradesh is available on various DTH platforms since 2013 and is mandatory for all DTH & Cable Operators to show Doordarshan channels.
Videocon D2H - Channel no. 896
Dish TV - Channel no. 820
Airtel Digital TV - Channel no. 350
Sun Direct - Channel no. 648
DD Free Dish - Channel no. 82
Tata Sky - Channel no. 1175

See also 
 List of programs broadcast by DD National 
 All India Radio 
 Ministry of Information and Broadcasting 
 DD Free Dish (formerly DD Direct Plus) 
 List of South Asian television channels by country

References

External links 
 Doordarshan Official Internet site 
 Doordarshan news site 

Television channels and stations established in 1994
Indian direct broadcast satellite services
Mass media in Madhya Pradesh
Doordarshan
1994 establishments in Madhya Pradesh